Jinsou Township is an rural township in the northwest of Xiangxiang City, Hunan Province, People's Republic of China.

Administrative divisions
The township is divided into 29 villages, the following areas: Jinsou Village, Fengshan Village, Hetang Village, Fuzheng Village, Baisha Village, Pashi Village, Souling Village, Longmen Village, Zhuyuan Village, Huaqiao Village, Pushi Village, Dushi Village, Yongle Village, Dinan Village, Fukang Village, Changle Village, Heshan Village, Zhenzhu Village, Dongling Village, Bayan Village, Jiangjia Village, Shunan Village, Duizi Village, Naping Village, Hongshi Village, Tuanshan Village, Maizi Village, Baoshi Village, Nanxing and Huashi Village.

Transportation

Expressway
The Changsha-Shaoshan-Loudi Expressway, which runs east through Huitang Town, Jinshi Town, Donghutang Town, Huaminglou Town and Daolin Town to Yuelu District, Changsha, and the west through Yueshan Town, Hutian Town to Louxing District, Loudi.

References

External links

Divisions of Xiangxiang